Stand Together is an American philanthropic organization that was first established in 2003 and is often referred to informally as the Koch Network. It is a 501(c)(3) nonprofit organization based in Arlington, Virginia, and was founded by Charles Koch to assist philanthropic activities across the United States. Formerly known as The Seminar Network, its renaming as Stand Together was announced on May 20, 2019. The founding CEO is Brian Hooks.

Founding and history
In 2003, Charles Koch began hosting annual meetings of business leaders and philanthropists to support various education and policy initiatives. From these seminars grew a philanthropic community of organizations working to address issues such as poverty, addiction, recidivism, gang violence and homelessness. In 2019, this advocacy organization became the Stand Together Foundation.

As it exists today, Stand Together seeks to identify and mentor organizations addressing society’s biggest challenges. A key part of the organization’s strategy is to work through what it refers to as “key institutions of society” – education, business, communities, and government – to discover innovative ways to “remove barriers so every person can rise.”

In a speech in January 2019 in Palm Springs, Charles Koch signaled he would shift away from partisan politics and focus on goals that cut across ideologies. Stand Together is considered a manifestation of those stated intentions. Charles Koch is considered less political than his brother, David Koch.

Brian Hooks is the current Chairman and CEO. He previously served as executive director of the Mercatus Center at George Mason University and is also president of the Charles Koch Foundation. Other leadership members include Evan Feinberg, Amy Pelletier, and Kevin Lavelle.

Operations
Hooks has explained the goal of Stand Together is to seek non-partisan, bottom-up solutions to societal issues, rather than focusing on partisan, top-down approaches. Founder Charles Koch has admitted that a political approach his organizations had taken in prior years proved unsuccessful and divisive. Despite this aim, some organization within the Stand Together community engage in policy and politics. In recent years, leaders of affiliated organizations have stated an intention to endorse policies and candidates regardless of political party.

Stand Together works on issues including education, poverty, criminal justice, immigration, free expression, trade, foreign policy, economic opportunity, technology and business as a force for good.

Similarly, on issues of policy, Stand Together led a broad bipartisan coalition on criminal justice reform – which saw leaders like Van Jones and organizations like the ACLU coming together with Senate Republicans and The Heritage Foundation – to pass the First Step Act in 2018. Stand Together has cited this approach as a key to its effectiveness and continues to bridge divides on this issue and many others like foreign policy and immigration.

References

Non-profit organizations based in the United States
Political and economic research foundations in the United States
Koch network